Events in the year 1929 in Bulgaria.

Incumbents 
Boris lll King of Bulgaria 

Andrey Lyapchev Chairman of the Council of Ministers

Events

Sports 

 FC Balkan Botevgrad, a Bulgarian football club, was established under the name "Stamen Panchev".

Births 
1 March - Georgi Markov, writer (died 1978)

References 

 
1920s in Bulgaria
Years of the 20th century in Bulgaria
Bulgaria
Bulgaria